Remigijus is a masculine Lithuanian given name. Notable people with the name include:

Remigijus Kančys (born 1987), Lithuanian marathon runner
Remigijus Kriukas (born 1961), Lithuanian painter
Remigijus Lupeikis (born 1964), Lithuanian cyclist
Remigijus Morkevičius (1982–2016), Lithuanian mixed martial artist and kickboxer
Remigijus Pocius (born 1968), Lithuanian footballer
Remigijus Šimašius (born 1974), Lithuanian jurist
Remigijus Valiulis (born 1958), Lithuanian sprinter
Remigijus Vilkaitis (born 1950), Lithuanian actor
Remigijus Žemaitaitis (born 1982), Lithuanian politician

Lithuanian masculine given names